Order of Independence and Freedom was a military award from the People's Republic of China. It was created in 1955, to give recognition to men who distinguished themselves "conspicuously by gallantry and intrepidity" in combat with an enemy of China in the Second Sino-Japanese War. There are three grades: First Class, Second Class, and Third Class.

Pattern

Service Ribbon

Notable recipients
Ten Marshals: Zhu De, Peng Dehuai, Lin Biao, Liu Bocheng, He Long, Chen Yi, Luo Ronghuan, Xu Xiangqian, Nie Rongzhen, Ye Jianying.
Ten Senior Generals: Su Yu, Xu Haidong, Huang Kecheng, Chen Geng, Tan Zheng, Xiao Jinguang, Zhang Yunyi, Luo Ruiqing, Wang Shusheng, Xu Guangda.
General officer: Song Renqiong, Xiao Ke, Xu Shiyou, Li Kenong, Huang Yongsheng, etc.
Lieutenant general: Ding Qiusheng, Wang Jinshan, Wang Enmao, etc.
Major general: Han Dongshan, Sun Chaoqun, Yang Yongsong, Yuan Kefu, etc.

References 

Military awards and decorations of the People's Liberation Army
Awards established in 1955
1955 establishments in China